Auda Abu Tayeh or Awda Abu Tayih ( 11 January 1874 – 27 December 1924) 
was the leader (shaikh) of a section of the Howeitat or Huwaytat tribe of Bedouin Arabs at the time of the Great Arab Revolt during the First World War. The Howeitat lived in what is now Saudi Arabia/Jordan.

Auda was a significant figure in the Arab Revolt; outside Arabia he is mainly known through his portrayal in British Col. T. E. Lawrence's account Seven Pillars of Wisdom, and from the partly fictionalised depiction of him in David Lean's film Lawrence of Arabia.

The Howeitat
Lawrence recorded that the Jazi Howeitat had formerly been under the leadership of the House of Rashid, the amirs of Ha'il, but had since fragmented and that Auda had come to control the Eastern Howeitat, known as the abu Tayi. Auda had taken up the claims of his father, Harb abu Tayi (? – 1904), who had contested the tribe's chieftainship with Arar ibn Jazi. Auda and his ibn Jazi rival, Arar's half-brother Abtan, diverted the energies of the Howeitat—previously settled farmers and camel herders—into raiding, greatly increasing the tribe's wealth but introducing a mainly nomadic lifestyle. Tensions between them and the Ottoman administration had increased after an incident in 1908, when two soldiers were killed who had been sent to demand payment of a tax that Auda claimed to have already paid.

Life
Auda abu Tayi is considered a hero of the Arab revolt. For while Prince Faisal was the prophet of Islam, Auda was the warrior.  T.E. Lawrence romanticized him as someone who epitomized everything noble, powerful and proud about the Bedouin, "the greatest fighting man in northern Arabia", with an impressive lineage of many generations of great desert Howeitat warriors of the Arabian peninsula. Lawrence wrote that

"He saw life as a saga, all the events in it were significant: all personages in contact with him heroic, his mind was stored with poems of old raids and epic tales of fights."

As was customary in the desert Auda was known for his hospitality and generosity which "kept him always poor, despite the profits of a hundred raids". He claimed he had been married 28 times and wounded more than a dozen times in action. Legend had it that he had killed 75 Arabs by his own hand; he didn't even bother to keep count of the Turks. In battle Auda became a wild beast assuaged only after he had killed. He was hot-headed but always kept a smile on his face. Despite his fierce reputation he was described as modest, direct, honest, kind-hearted and warmly-loved.

Auda lived in the desert near the Hejaz railway. He preferred the isolation which became necessary after he killed one too many debt collectors from Constantinople and the Turks put a price on his head. The desert landscapes were the exact areas Faisal and Lawrence needed to operate in to avoid close attention from the Turks. Lawrence wrote:

"Only by means of Auda abu Tayi could we swing the tribes from Ma'an to Aqaba so violently in our favour that they would help us take Aqaba and its hills from their Turkish garrisons."

The Arab Revolt
Auda's tribesmen were reputedly the finest fighters in the desert, which is why his support and assistance were vital to the Arab Revolt. Auda had initially been in the pay of the Ottoman Empire, but switched allegiance to Lawrence and Faisal bin Al Hussein. With the incentives of kicking the Turks out of Arabia, and the lure of gold and booty, Auda joined the Arab Revolt, becoming a fervent supporter of the Arab independence movement (apparently going so far as to smash his Turkish false teeth with a hammer to demonstrate his patriotism). He was repeatedly approached by the Turks with further financial inducements if he would switch to their side, but he refused to go back on his word. He was an Arab patriot and he would ride with Lawrence. He and his tribesmen were instrumental in the fall of Aqaba (July 1917) and Damascus (October 1918).

Post-war years
After the collapse of the Arab government in Damascus, Auda retired to the desert, building a modern palace at Al-Jafr east of Ma'an with captured Turkish slave labour. Before it was complete, however, he died in 1924 of natural causes. He is buried in Ras al-Ain, Amman, Jordan.

He had one son, Mohammed, who died in 1987, and thirteen grandchildren who all live in Jordan.

Portrayal in film and media
He was portrayed in the David Lean film Lawrence of Arabia by Anthony Quinn as a complex character who blends together paternal wisdom and desert piracy. The depiction of Auda as interested only in financial rewards has been criticised, however, as he was a genuine supporter of Arab independence and was closely involved in planning the Revolt's military actions. Whatever the real motivations of Auda Abu Tayi, much of his presentation seems rooted in his sensationalised depiction by Lowell Thomas (and to an extent by Lawrence himself) as a figure of anarchic, primitive masculine energy deliberately set against the idea of British 'civilisation' (see also Orientalism). Auda's descendants were so incensed by the portrayal of their ancestor that they sued Columbia Studios, the film's producers; the case was eventually dropped.

Auda was also featured as a supporting character in Terence Rattigan's Lawrence-themed play Ross. The portrayal of Auda here is generally more well-rounded than in the film; he is shown to be a true Arab patriot, although he still retains fondness for financial reward. As Faisal and the film's fictional Sherif Ali were not present in the play, he served as the primary Arab character.

He is also portrayed in 2009 Qatari film Auda abu Tayeh, which talks about his life in Arabia to Arab Revolt, and his death.

Lawrence on Auda
When Lawrence attended Prince Faisal's camp at Wejd, he arrived late on February 16, 1916, bursting into the conference hall.
"Auda was very simply dressed, northern fashion, in white cotton with a red Mosul head-cloth. He might be over fifty, and his black hair was streaked with white; but he was still strong and straight, loosely built, spare, and as active as a much younger man. His face was magnificent in its lines and hollows [...] He had large eloquent eyes, like black velvet in richness. His forehead was low and broad, his nose very high and sharp, powerfully hooked: his mouth rather large and mobile: his beard and moustaches had been trimmed to a point in Howeitat style, with the lower jaw shaven underneath." 

"His hospitality was sweeping, inconvenient except to very hungry souls. His generosity kept him always poor, despite the profits of a hundred raids. He had married twenty-eight times, had been wounded thirteen times, and in the battles he provoked had seen all his tribesmen hurt, and most of his relations slain. He himself had slain seventy-five men, Arabs, by his own hand in battle: and never a man except in battle. Of the number of dead Turks he could give no account: they did not enter the register. His Toweiha under him had become the first fighters of the desert, with a tradition of desperate courage, and a sense of superiority which never left them while there was life and work to do [...] but which had reduced them from twelve hundred men to less than five hundred, in thirty years."

Report by French Military Mission Sergeant Marcel Matte
Sergeant Marcel Matte gives his opinion:

"The personality of Auda Abu Tay [sic] is much exaggerated: we are told that: 'He had come down to us like a knight-errant, chafing at our delay in Wejh, anxious only to be acquiring merit for Arab freedom in his own lands.' This is obviously exaggerated: carried along by the style given to the account, the author creates a portrait of this Bedouin chief far finer than reality. The character, whom we saw several times at Wejh, was not of this high calibre—he was a Bedouin, sly, wily and avaricious."

References

1874 births
1924 deaths
Bedouin tribal chiefs
Military leaders of World War I
Ottoman Arab nationalists
Arabs from the Ottoman Empire
Arab independence activists